Asad Ali can refer to:

 Asad Ali (born 1988), Pakistani cricketer
 Asad Ali Khan (1937–2011), Indian musician
 Asad Ali Khan Bahadur (fl. 1765–1791), ruler of Chenchelimala
 Asad Ali Toor, Pakistani journalist

See also
 Ali Asad (disambiguation)